Sazlıdere Dam is a reservoir dam in the Başakşehir district of  Istanbul Province, Turkey. The dam supplies the European side of the city and its suburbs with drinking water. The Turkish State Hydraulic Works backed the development of the dam, which was constructed between 1992 and 1996. The reservoir supplies 50 hm³ of drinking water annually.

See also
List of dams and reservoirs in Turkey

References
DSI directory, State Hydraulic Works (Turkey), Retrieved 2009-12-15

Dams in Istanbul Province
Dams completed in 1996
Başakşehir